Saint-Plancard is a commune in the Haute-Garonne department in southwestern France.

Population
In 2019, the commune had a population of 392. As of 2019, there are 268 dwellings in the commune, of which 198 primary residences.

See also
Communes of the Haute-Garonne department

References

Communes of Haute-Garonne